Darlinghurst is an inner-city, eastern suburb of Sydney, New South Wales, Australia. Darlinghurst is located immediately east of the Sydney central business district (CBD) and Hyde Park, within the local government area of the City of Sydney.  It is often colloquially referred to as "Darlo".

Darlinghurst is a densely populated suburb with the majority of residents living in apartments or terraced houses. Once a slum and red-light district, Darlinghurst has undergone urban renewal since the 1980s to become a cosmopolitan area made up of precincts. Places such as Victoria Street (which connects Darlinghurst to Potts Point in the north), Stanley Street (Little Italy) and Crown Street (Vintage and Retro Fashion) are known as culturally rich destinations. These high street areas are connected by a network of lane-ways and street corners with shops, cafes and bars.

Demographically, Darlinghurst is home to the highest percentage of generation X and Y in Australia. The majority of businesses in Darlinghurst are independently owned and operated small businesses with over 50% of all commercial activity in the area being consumer oriented: indie retail, food, drink, dining, leisure and personal services. Darlinghurst is also home to large number of off-street creative industries.

Darlinghurst's main street is Oxford Street. This major Sydney road runs east from the south-eastern corner of Hyde Park through Darlinghurst and Paddington and terminates at Bondi Junction. Oxford Street is one of Sydney's most famous shopping and dining strips. The Darlinghurst end is well known around the world as the centre of Sydney's gay community, is the yearly parade route of the Sydney Mardi Gras and the spiritual birthplace of the LGBT rights movement. It is home to a number of prominent gay venues and businesses, while more broadly Darlinghurst is a centre of Sydney's burgeoning small bar scene.

From the 1990s onwards Oxford Street began to garner a reputation for being Sydney's primary "nightclub strip", popular with both gay and straight clubbers, surpassing the notorious red-light district of Kings Cross in popularity. As a result of the influx of revellers, crime rates increased in the area around 2007, particularly for assaults and robberies. This reported increase should be understood in terms of a very low background crime rate in East Sydney in general. The 2014 lockout laws saw many nightclubs close and the crime rate drop once again, with a new focus on small bars, restaurants and cafes after the lockout laws ended in 2020.

There are a number of named localities in and around Darlinghurst including Taylor Square, Three Saints Square, and confusingly also East Sydney. Locals have used this name to refer to the area immediately around Stanley Street in the suburb's west, however the title is used more broadly throughout the area from Woolloomooloo up to Taylor Square where the old Darlinghurst Gaol still has the words East Sydney in brass lettering above the main entrance. This is because from 1900 to 1969 the entire area to the east of Sydney's CBD, from the harbour to Redfern, was an electorate known as the Division of East Sydney. Already in 1820 the entire ridge line running from Potts Point to Surry Hills was known as Eastern Hill.

Darlinghurst shares a postcode (2010) and an extensive soft southern border with neighbouring suburb Surry Hills which, with Paddington to the east and Woolloomooloo, Rushcutters Bay and Potts Point to the north, comprise the metropolitan region of East Sydney. Although only minutes walk away from the Sydney CBD, this region is geographically distinct from it; separated from the more well known commercial centre by several landmarks: Central railway station, Hyde Park, St Mary's Cathedral and The Domain. East Sydney hosts many well-known restaurants.

Sydney's Eastern Suburbs cover all the land from the east of Darlinghurst up to the Pacific Ocean.

History
The suburb was originally known as Eastern Hill and then Henrietta Town, after Governor Lachlan Macquarie's wife, whose second name was Henrietta. The loyalties changed with the change of governors and the suburb became Darlinghurst in honour of Elizabeth Darling, the popular wife of Governor Ralph Darling, during the early 19th century. The suffix 'hurst' is derived from the Old English word hyrst, meaning wooded area. In 1973, Darlinghurst saw a green ban as a ban on all commercial construction was placed by residents as residents demanded that all housing should be high density low-rise with adequate provision for low and middle income families to live within the inner-city area.

Landmarks

Darlinghurst has two of Sydney's museums: the Australian Museum (a natural history museum) and the Sydney Jewish Museum. The suburb also features St Vincent's Hospital, and is associated with the Sacred Heart Hospice on Darlinghurst Road, and the Garvan Institute of Medical Research.

Darlinghurst Gaol

Darlinghurst Gaol, the large sandstone penal complex in the middle of Darlinghurst was built between 1836 and 1840. The large sandstone walls still bear convict markings, and the complex features six wings surrounding a circular chapel. Australian poet Henry Lawson spent time incarcerated here during some of the turbulent years of his life. The last hanging at the gaol was in 1907 (Jahn, 1997). The site became East Sydney Technical College in 1921, but was turned into the National Art School from 1995.

Darlinghurst Fire Station

Darlinghurst Fire Station was completed in 1912, this three-storey brick and stone building occupies a prominent location at the corner of Darlinghurst Road and Victoria Street. It was designed in 1910 by Walter Liberty Vernon (Jahn, 1997). It still functions as a fire station and is listed on the Register of the National Estate.

Darlinghurst Courthouse

Darlinghurst Courthouse is an imposing heritage-listed sandstone building on Taylor Square. It was designed by architect Mortimer Lewis in 1844, and has a Greek Revival style facade. The central block is adapted from an 1823 design in Peter Nicholson's The New Practical Builder (Apperly, Irving & Reynolds, 1989).

Oxford Street

Oxford Street is the major commercial thoroughfare of Darlinghurst, running from the south-east corner of Hyde Park, through Taylor Square and beyond into Paddington, Woollahra and Bondi Junction, respectively. Oxford Street was originally called The South Head Road and work commenced on the road in 1811 (Faro, 2000). It was a toll road in its early years with the toll gates being located near present-day Glenmore Road. Oxford Street assumed its current name in 1875. Oxford Square is located at the intersection of Oxford and Burton Streets. Oxford Square is also the name of a small shopping centre located opposite, on the corner of Oxford and Riley Streets. Football Federation Australia have their head office at 1 Oxford Street.

Stanley Street

Stanley Street is one of the suburb's two secondary restaurant strips (with Victoria Street) and is often referred to as Sydney's first "Little Italy". However, the restaurants range from Japanese, Thai and Italian and the prices range from basic to moderate. There is an annual Italian Festival held here every June.

Victoria Street
Victoria Street is the other major cafe strip. Restaurants range from basic to upmarket. The majority of the cafes have outdoor seating. Several iconic restaurants are in this area, such as Tropicana and Bar Coluzzi.

Inter-War apartments

 Ballina, 3-5 Darley Street
 Claridge, 28-30 Flinders Street
 Greencourt, 1 Darley Street (1919)
 Hillcrest, 114 Burton Street
 Kurrajong, 138 Darlinghurst Road
 Mont Clair, 347 Liverpool Street
 Portree, 2a Darley Street
 Royal Court, 227 Crown Street
 Tennyson House, 1 Farrell Avenue designed by Claud Hamilton 1924
 The Rutland, 381 Liverpool Street
 The Savoy, 2-10 Hardy Street designed by Claud Hamilton 1919

The Horizon

The Horizon, located in Forbes Street, Darlinghurst, is a 43-storey residential high-rise building completed in 1998. It has a distinctive scalloped facade and is finished in rendered concrete. The building was designed by Sydney architect Harry Seidler and is controversial in that it was one of the first high-rise buildings constructed in the predominately low rise area, with critics saying it caused overshadowing of the surrounding area. The Horizon apartments consist of a residential tower and two lower buildings of apartments, 6 levels of car parks, swimming pool, a tennis court, gym and surrounding gardens.

Demographics

At the 2021 census, the population of Darlinghurst was 10,615.

This was a higher rate of male residents than the national average of 49.3%. In Darlinghurst, 45.2% of people were born in Australia. The most common other countries of birth were England 6.1%, New Zealand 3,8%, Thailand 2.2%, United States of America 2.0% and China 1.6%.  63.0% of people only spoke English at home. Other languages spoken at home included Thai 2.1%, Spanish 2.1%, French 1.8%, Mandarin 1.6% and Italian 1.3%. The most common response for religion was No Religion at 42.7%. Of occupied private dwellings in Darlinghurst, 77.0% were flats or apartments and 21.1% were semi-detached, row or terrace houses, townhouses etc. Just 0.5% of dwellings were separate houses, compared to the national average of 72.9%.

Commercial area
Darlinghurst's commercial activity is centred on Oxford Street, and extends to Victoria Street, Flinders Street, Crown Street, William Street, and Darlinghurst Road. There are a large number of cafés, restaurants and take-away food stores throughout Darlinghurst, as well as a large number of pubs and nightclubs, many of which are on Oxford Street. These pubs and clubs were subject to controversial 'lock-out' laws imposed by the Liberal state government in February 2014, in which venues stopped admitting new customers after 01:30, and ceased the service of alcohol between 03:00 and 05:00. These laws were introduced as a response to violence in the Inner City of Sydney that was related to alcohol intoxication. The lockout laws were repealed in January 2020 with a focus on small bars over big nightclubs. There is also a significant retail presence, including fashion retailers.

Transport
Darlinghurst is well-served by public transport, with many bus routes from the Eastern Suburbs converging on Oxford Street prior to entering the Sydney central business district. Route 333 between Circular Quay and Bondi Beach travels through Darlinghurst along Oxford Street. Routes 352, 373, 396 and 440 also travel through the suburb on Oxford Street. Buses that travel through the centre of Darlinghurst are routes 311 and 389.

There are no train stations in Darlinghurst, however Kings Cross railway station on the Sydney Trains Eastern Suburbs & Illawarra railway line is just over the northern border of the suburb. Museum station on the City Circle, is located just to the west of Darlinghurst, on the south-west corner of Hyde Park.

Schools

Darlinghurst Public School, located on the corner of Liverpool Street and Womerah Avenue, was opened in 1884. It teaches both boys and girl students from Kindergarten to Year 6 grade. Sydney Grammar School is located on College Street, across the road from Hyde Park. This school is a boys-only private school which opened in 1857.

The Sydney Church of England Girls' Grammar School (now called SCEGGS Darlinghurst) was founded in 1895 in Victoria Street, Darlinghurst. It moved to its current site in Forbes Street, in 1901. The former Marist Brothers High School at 280–296 Liverpool Street is now an apartment complex named Alexandra. The school occupied this site from 1911 until 1968 when it moved to Marist College Canberra.

The National Art School of Australia, a specialist Art school in collaboration with Sydney TAFE, dates back to 1859.

The University of Notre Dame's School of Medicine and the School of Nursing are located in the historic parish buildings associated with the Sacred Heart Parish in Darlinghurst. The complex includes facilities for use by medical and nursing students such as simulated wards, practise wet laboratories and clinical skills laboratories in addition to simulated consulting rooms.

Churches

Darlinghurst has four functioning churches: 
 God in the city, an Assemblies of God congregation affiliated with Christian City Churches
 St. Pauls Lutheran Church congregation (Sydney Lutheran Parish)
 St John's, an Anglican congregation. St John's operates Rough Edges, a street outreach centre that functions as a cafe and drop-in centre.  It provides a range of services to the local community, including the homeless.
 Sacred Heart Catholic Church is on the corner of Darlinghurst Road and Oxford Street.
There is also a variety of smaller chapels and religious services attached to St Vincent's Hospital and other religious organisations in the suburb.

The building which previously housed the Church of Christ, Scientist is now a private residence. There is also the defunct St. Peter's Anglican church, Bourke Street, which is now part of SCEGGS Darlinghurst.

Politics
The area has often been a battleground between the two councils of the City of Sydney and the City of South Sydney. Most of the suburb belonged to South Sydney, however the New South Wales State Government moved the borders repeatedly in order to change the make-up of the City of Sydney.  Many claim that these shifts have been attempted to shift the balance of power in the favour of the party in control of the State Government, though some residents of Darlinghurst and Potts Point (the former North Ward of the City of South Sydney) felt that the postcodes of 2010 (Darlinghurst and Surry Hills) and 2011 (Elizabeth Bay, Kings Cross, Rushcutters Bay, Woolloomooloo and Potts Point) were relatively neglected by the City of South Sydney.

However, this battle is now moot since both councils were forced by the State Government to amalgamate in February 2004. An election was held on Saturday, 27 March 2004, in order to elect a new council for the redesignated (expanded) City of Sydney.
Critics of the amalgamation have claimed that the election demonstrated strong voter backlash against the State Government for pressing the issue. The Australian Labor Party, for whom the area was usually safe, had their primary vote reduced to approximately 20%. The independent Clover Moore took the Lord Mayoral position, having campaigned against the Government's dismissal of the council.

At a federal level, Darlinghurst falls in the electorates of the Division of Sydney and Wentworth. Its current parliamentary representatives are Tanya Plibersek (Labor) and Allegra Spender (Independent). These electorates have some of the state's strongest support for The Greens.

Heritage listings

New South Wales State Heritage Register 

Darlinghurst has a number of heritage-listed sites, including the following sites listed on the New South Wales State Heritage Register:
 Bourke Street: St Peter's Church
 348a Bourke Street: Bourke Street Wesleyan Chapel
 411a Bourke Street: St Sophia Greek Orthodox Church, formerly the Bourke Street Congregational Church and School
 1 Darley Street: Stoneleigh (a former home of Phillip Adams)
 2 Darley Street: Iona
 120 Darlinghurst Road: St John's Anglican Church
 56 Oxford Street: G. A. Zink and Sons Building
 Taylor Square: Darlinghurst Courthouse
 intersection of Taylor Square, Oxford, Forbes and Bourke Street: Taylor Square Substation No. 6 and Underground Conveniences
 101-115 William Street: William House

Register of the National Estate (defunct register)
The following buildings are listed on the now defunct Register of the National Estate:

Culture

The Darlinghurst area is famous for the annual Sydney Gay and Lesbian Mardi Gras. The parade, first held in 1978 as a protest march by members of the gay and lesbian community, marks the end of a three-week festival and takes place on Oxford Street, the main street that runs through several suburbs, including Darlinghurst. 

The Sydney Jewish Museum is on the corner of Darlinghurst Road and Burton Street (148 Darlinghurst Rd) and features exhibitions about the Jewish community in Sydney.

There are many small private art galleries in Darlinghurst, including Black Eye Gallery (Darlinghurst Road; photography), King Street Gallery on William (William Street; painting), Conny Dietzschold Gallery (Crown Street; contemporary art), Stanley Street Gallery (Stanley Street; contemporary art), Robin Gibson (Liverpool Street; painting, sculpture),  Gallery 9 (Darley Street; contemporary art) and Liverpool Street Gallery (Liverpool Street; contemporary art). Entry to these galleries is free, and most of the exhibitions will display the work of Australian artists.

There is also a gallery in the National Art School that hosts exhibitions in a mid-19th century sandstone building.

The Watters Gallery in Riley Street was a longstanding institution run by Frank Watters and his associates Geoffrey and Alex Legge, finally closing its doors in November 2018.

The Eternity Playhouse in Burton Street Darlinghurst opened in 2013, following the renovation of the former Burton Street Tabernacle, which was founded in 1887. Following its purchase by the City of Sydney in 2004, plans were gradually developed to renovate the building as a theatre. The 200-seat theatre is the home of the Darlinghurst Theatre Company, and the renovation was designed by architecture firm Tonkin Zulaikha Greer.

Notable residents 
 Phillip Adams, Australian humanist social commentator, broadcaster, public intellectual and farmer, lived at Stoneleigh in the mid to late 1980s
 Baz Luhrmann and Catherine Martinlived in Iona (1880) from 1997 to 2016
 George Edward Ardill (1889–1964)evangelist and social worker
 Flora Sydney Eldershaw (1897–1956)author and critic
 Cecil Patrick Healy (1881–1918)swimmer and commercial traveller
 Michael HutchenceINXS singer lived in Darlinghurst in the 1980s
 Damian Moss, born in Darlinghurst, former pitcher for the Atlanta Braves and the San Francisco Giants.
 Karl Stefanovic, host of Nine Network's Today Show
 Mark Nielsen, businessman

See also

References

Further reading
Apperly, Richard; Irving, Robert; Reynolds, Peter (1989). A Pictorial Guide to Identifying Australian Architecture: Styles and Terms from 1788 to the Present. Sydney, Angus & Robertson. 
Faro, Clive (2000). Street Seen: A History of Oxford St. Carlton South, Melbourne University Press. 
Jahn, Graham (1997). Sydney Architecture. Sydney, The Watermark Press.

External links 

 Sydney City Council
  [CC-By-SA]
 [CC-By-SA]
  [CC-By-SA]
  [CC-By-SA]

 
Suburbs of Sydney
Gay villages in Australia
Entertainment districts in Australia
LGBT culture in Sydney
Red-light districts in Australia
Green bans